Nasséré is a department or commune of Bam Province in north-western Burkina Faso. Its capital lies at the town of Nasséré. According to the 1996 census the department has a total population of 10,591.

Towns and villages
Nasséré
Béguemdéré
Biliga-Fulbé 
Biliga-Mossi 
Bilkaradié 
Fénéguéné 
Foutanga 
Kolladé 
Sampalo
Sika
Sillaléba 
Tamiga-Fulbé
Tamiga-Mossi
Tibtenga-Fulbé
Tibtenga-Mossi 
Tora

References

Departments of Burkina Faso
Bam Province